Tre Sullivan (born December 21, 1994) is a former American football safety. He played college football at Shepherd University.

Professional career

Sullivan signed with the Philadelphia Eagles as an undrafted free agent on May 11, 2017. He was waived/injured by the Eagles on September 2, 2017 and placed on injured reserve. He was released on September 8, 2017. On November 7, 2017 Sullivan was re-signed to the Eagles’ practice squad. He was on the practice squad when the Eagles defeated the New England Patriots in Super Bowl LII. He signed a reserve/future contract with the Eagles on February 7, 2018.

Sullivan made the Eagles initial 53-man roster, and appeared in his first career NFL game during the season opening 18–12 victory over the Atlanta Falcons on September 6, 2018. He was released the next day after a crucial special teams mistake and re-signed to the practice squad. He was promoted back to the active roster on October 10. He was waived on August 28, 2019.

On October 16, 2019, Sullivan was selected by the DC Defenders with the 23rd overall pick in Phase 5 of the 2020 XFL Draft.

References

External links
Shepherd Rams bio
 Philadelphia Eagles bio

1994 births
Living people
American football safeties
People from Takoma Park, Maryland
Philadelphia Eagles players
Players of American football from Maryland
Shepherd Rams football players
Sportspeople from Montgomery County, Maryland